Yalavagi is a village in Karnataka, India.

Cities and towns in Haveri district
 Yalavagi village is Railway station Stoppage to Connecting the Laxmeshwar Town [13;Km] And Gadag[53;Km]